The Supermarine Seagull was a amphibian biplane flying boat designed and produced by the British aircraft manufacturer Supermarine. It was developed from the experimental Supermarine Seal II.

Development of the Seagull started during 1920; it heavily drew upon the prior Supermarine Commercial Amphibian programme. Flown for the first time on 2 June 1921, it was evaluated for military applications but was initially rejected, thus Supermarine continued development as a private venture. During February 1922, a pilot order for two aircraft was placed by the Air Ministry, with follow-up orders coming in shortly thereafter; production of the Seagull is believed to have been highly influential in Supermarine's survival in an era typified by an industry-wide drought of customers.

The Seagull was inducted into the Fleet Air Arm, where it was typically used for gunnery spotting and reconnaissance duties. It was also operated by the Royal Australian Air Force for similar purposes, as well a single example being exported to Imperial Japan. Later on, a handful of secondhand military aircraft were bought by civilians and flown in Britain as civil aircraft. In Supermarine's lineup, the Seagull was effectively replaced by the more successful Walrus during the early 1930s.

Development

Background
The origins of the Seagull are heavily interconnected with the Supermarine Seal and the Supermarine Commercial Amphibian. Work on the Seal commenced in 1920, seeking to build upon the Commercial Amphibian, and thus incorporated a range of alterations and improvements, many of which were drawn from the Commercial's official review. According to Andrews and Morgan, the Supermarine Commercial Amphibian was retroactively predesignated as the Seal Mk I, while the new development effort, initially known as the Seal Mk II, later would become the Seagull Mk I.

Design work and the construction of a single prototype went ahead, performing its first flight during May 1921. On 2 June 1921, having completed manufacturer's trials, it was handed over for service trials with the RAF. Particular attention was paid to the aircraft's seaworthiness and low speed handling characteristics, including its relatively low landing speed. For easier stowage on board ships, the wings could be folded rearwards, which necessitated mounting the wings in a relatively forward position on the fuselage.

Early test flight revealed that original rudder design was inadequate, providing poor yaw characteristics. Multiple designs were rapidly trialled, leading to the addition of a fin extension on both the prototype and subsequent production aircraft. Aviation authors C. F. Andrews and E. B. Morgan observed that Supermarine paid particular attention to an Air Ministry design study on a fleet gunnery spotting amphibian during the type's development; however, no direct design impacts upon the aircraft are believed to be attributable to it. Having been sufficiently impressed by the prototype's performance, a pilot order for two aircraft was issued by the Air Ministry in February 1922.

Into production
On 4 July 1922, the name Seagull was adopted for the type. Only the single prototype used the Seagull Mk I designation; the subsequent production aircraft were instead designated Seagull Mk II. There were relatively few changes made between the prototype and production aircraft, although an alternative powerplant in the form of a single Napier Lion III engine was installed along with a modified nacelle.

During 1922, quantity production of the aircraft commenced; these Seagulls were supplied to the Air Ministry and Royal Navy. A total of 25 were built, although some of these were later modified. Andrews and Morgan note that the production of the Seagull, enabled by supportive orders largely from the British government, had been critical to the survival of Supermarine at this time. These early orders were intentionally spaced out into small batches to ensure that the firm was receiving sufficient business to stay operational.

In 1925, construction of the improved Seagull Mk III started in response to an order for Australia being placed in January of that year. This version was largely similar to the Seagull Mk II, but featured a more powerful Napier Lion V engine along with modified radiators to cope with extended tropical operations. Six of these were supplied to the Royal Australian Air Force between 1926 and 1927.

A single Seagull Mk II was subsequently rebuilt, being fitted with Handley-Page leading edge slots and twin fins and rudders in 1928. Some historians have considered this to be the Seagull Mark IV, although Supermarine never designated it as such.

In 1930, work was started on a flying boat of similar size and layout but with a predominantly metal airframe, powered by a Bristol Jupiter IX engine in pusher configuration. First flown in 1933, this aircraft was at first known as the Seagull V, prior to the more commonly used name of Walrus being adopted for the type.

Design
The Supermarine Seagull is a amphibian biplane flying boat, powered by a single Napier Lion engine. This engine was mounted in a nacelle slung from the aircraft's upper wing and powered a four-blade propeller in a tractor configuration. The lower wing was set in the shoulder position and had two bays. The floats were attached to the lower wing near the wingtips via struts, their positioning maximised buoyancy. For land operations, the Seagull was equipped with a retractable undercarriage; pilots lacked aids such as indicators or alarms, thus were reliant on training and memory to deploy the undercarriage when applicable.

The fuselage had an oval cross-section and had a planing bottom with two steps. The interior of the fuselage was divided into several watertight compartments. The pilot was seated in a relatively forward position, at a distance from the other crew members, being directly ahead of the fuel tanks; the cockpit was provisioned with a single retractable machine gun. The radio operator was located just behind the wing, while the rear gunner position was further back still. The majority of the aircraft was constructed from wood.

Operational history

The Seagull's assigned role in British service was that of a fleet spotter, being principally flown by 440 (Fleet Reconnaissance) Flight, operating from HMS Eagle. During its service life, it determined to be most practically used for coastal reconnaissance missions. The aircraft was normally operated by a crew of three (Pilot, Observer, and Radio-Operator), while the sole armament installed was a .303 in (7.7 mm) Lewis gun.

During 1925, the Seagull Mk II was the first British aircraft to conduct a catapult launch; the type was used extensively to test various designs of catapult, harnessing both cordite charges and compressed air to power them, prior to their widespread introduction. That same year, the type started to be superseded by the Fairey IIId, as the practical value of the Seagull had been determined to be lacking in British service by this point.

The Australian Seagulls were operated by the No. 101 Flight RAAF; to avoid the need to build land facilities, they were typically based on board RAN ships. Even prior to the type's delivery, the service had decided to perform a series of photographic survey flights, covering areas from the Great Barrier Reef to the Persian Gulf. During its later life, the Seagull served on board HMAS Albatross, Australia's first indigenously built warship. Andrews and Morgan note that the Seagull appears to have been operated to greater success with the RAN than it was by the RAF.

Following an agreement made in 1922, a single Seagull Mk II was exported to Imperial Japan, intended to demonstrate and promote the capabilities of British aircraft and encourage further sales.

Three ex-military aircraft were entered civilian use, being placed on the British Civil Register. During the 1924 King's Cup Race, a pair of Seagulls were entered with the Air Ministry's authorisation.

Operators

Royal Australian Air Force received six aircraft.
No. 101 Flight RAAF

Imperial Japanese Navy Air Service received one aircraft.

Fleet Air Arm received 26 aircraft.

Surviving aircraft
 The Fleet Air Arm Museum owns the front hull of an unknown Seagull. It was in use until 1974 as a garden shed, and presented to the museum in exchange for a new shed. It is currently on long-term loan to Solent Sky, an air museum in Southampton.
 The Royal Air Force Museum London had a Seagull V on display in their Battle of Britain hall until October 2016 after which it was moved into storage.

Specifications (Seagull II)

See also

References

Citations

Bibliography

 Andrews, C.F. and E.B. Morgan. Supermarine Aircraft Since 1914. London: Putnam, 1981. .
 
 Brown, David. "Supermarine Walrus I & Seagull V Variants". Aircraft in Profile, Volume 11. Windsor, Berkshire, UK: Profile Publications Ltd., 1972.
 Kightly, James and Wallsgrove, Roger. Supermarine Walrus & Stranraer. Sandomierz, Poland/Redbourn, UK: Mushroom Model Publications, 2004. .
 
 Thetford, Owen. British Naval Aircraft Since 1912. London: Putnam, 1982 (5th ed.)

External links

 Supermarine Seal and Seagull – British Aircraft Directory

Amphibious aircraft
1920s British military reconnaissance aircraft
Biplanes
Seagull (1921)
Single-engined tractor aircraft
Aircraft first flown in 1921